Diana Hemingway (1970-December 20, 2016) was an activist for "trans/queer issues, sex worker rights, disability rights, economic justice, racism, and issues impacting the kink community."

Biography
Hemingway's family were Irish Gypsies working the carnival circuit, traveling around the US, eventually settling in Fort Lauderdale. She went to college to study photography after having worked for Greenpeace.

After a period of self discovery, Hemingway identified as a "genderqueer transfeminine person" and that alienated many. She found herself depressed and working as a trams escort. Facing homelessness, her mental health continued to deteriorate. Hemingway ended up committing suicide.

Activism
Hemingway founded the first South Florida chapter of SWOP.

Awards and honors
She was part of the first group of honorees on the National LGBTQ Wall of Honor.

References

1970 births
2016 deaths
American LGBT rights activists
American LGBT photographers
American women photographers
Transgender sex workers